Narendra Modi  the leader of Bharatiya Janata Party was sworn in as Chief Minister of Gujarat for second time on 22 December 2002 following victory in 2002 Gujarat Legislative Assembly election.

Cabinet ministers
Vajubhai Vala 
Ashok Bhatt 
Kaushik Patel 
Anandiben Patel 
Narottam Patel
Ramanlal Vora
Bhupendrasinh Chudasama
I K Jadeja 
Mangubhai Patel

Ministers of State
Bavku Ughad 
Dilip Thakore 
Bhupendrasinh Chudasma
Anilkumar Patel 
Prabhatsinh Chauhan 
Amit Shah 
Saurabh Patel

References

 https://www.rediff.com/election/2002/dec/22guj.htm

Modi 02
Chief Ministership of Narendra Modi
Modi 2
2002 establishments in Gujarat
Cabinets established in 2002
2007 disestablishments in India
Cabinets disestablished in 2007